Goliath and the Vampires is a 1961 Italian peplum film directed by Sergio Corbucci and Giacomo Gentilomo.

Plot
Set in the ancient world, this film follows a powerful muscular man out to battle a vampire and his forces that go from village to village taking slaves and female victims.

Cast 
 Gordon Scott: Maciste 
 Gianna Maria Canale: Astra 
 Jacques Sernas: Kurtick 
 Leonora Ruffo: Guja 
 Annabella Incontrera: Magda  
 Mario Feliciani: Omar

Production
Both Giacomo Gentilomo and Sergio Corbucci are credited as directors of the film. Barry Atkinson stated Corbucci's input to the film was minimal.

Release
Goliath and the Vampires was released theatrically in Italy as Maciste control il vampiro on 21 August 1961. It was released theatrically in the United States in April 1964.  American International Television released the film to television as part of its 1968 Young Adult Theatre package as The Vampires.

The film was made available on home video by Something Weird.

Reception
From contemporary reviews, the Monthly Film Bulletin stated that the film was a "mixture of handsomely decorated spectacle and the supernatural" with "first rate-editing". The review concluded that the reviewer "missed the guiding hands of a Bava or Cottafavi; and it seems probable that the film's intermittent drive and suspense can be more safely attributed to Corbucci than to his co-director, Giacomo Gentilomo" In Variety, the reviewer "Tube." declared that "even the most ardent devotees of these overstuffed, simpleminded muscle spasms from Italy figure to be disenchanted with this latest entry in that league." The review found the film "ludicrously written and crudely executed" and that Gordon Scott's acting was unsubtle.

From retrospective reviews, Howard Hughes wrote in his book on Italian cinema that Gordon Scott's performance was "above average" in comparison to other contemporary genre films. In their book on Italian Sword and Sandal Films, Roy Kinnard and Tony Crnkovich noted that the film's production design by Kosta Krivokapic and Gianni Polidori was aided by Alvaro Mancori's cinematography, which was described as "striking" and that the film was a memorable entry in the peplum film genre. The review also lamented that "most of the available prints have faded color." In his book on Italian peplum films, Barry Atkinson also praised the set design and cinematography as "an artful blend of creepy fantasy and Gothicism".

References

Bibliography

External links

1961 films
Films directed by Sergio Corbucci
Films directed by Giacomo Gentilomo
Peplum films
Maciste films
Italian vampire films
Films scored by Angelo Francesco Lavagnino
Sword and sandal films
1960s Italian films